Buck County Transport (BCT) is a private, non-profit organization that operates transportation services in Bucks County, Pennsylvania. BCT is headquartered in Holicong, Pennsylvania, and operates bus services throughout Bucks County. The organization currently operates a shared ride program, two DART bus lines, and provides discounted transportation for participants of the Medical Assistance Transportation Program (MATP) and for disabled persons. In addition, Bucks County Transport operates TMA Bucks' Rushbus services.

Services 

 Shared Ride Program
 Registered parties are able to schedule transportation with Bucks County Transport. Service is provided on a first-come, first-served basis and transportation must be scheduled at least two days in advance.
 DART Bus Lines
 Doylestown DART
 DART West
Bucks County Courthouse Shuttle
 Medical Assistance Transportation
 Free transportation is provided for MATP consumers to all health care services that are covered by MATP.
 Persons with Disabilities Program
 Bucks County residents between the ages of 18 and 64 that can provide written verification of a disability are eligible for a discounted rate.
 Rushbus
 Bucks County Transport is responsible for operating the TMA Bucks Rushbus service, which connect employers to SEPTA train and bus service. There are two Rushbus lines: the Bristol Rushbus and the Richboro-Warminster Rushbus.

DART 
Bucks County Transit operates two bus lines under the DART brand. Both lines are located within the Doylestown, New Britain, and Chalfont areas. No bus service is operated by BCT on Sundays or holidays. Both DART routes have a fare of $1.00, with senior citizens allowed to ride for free.

Doylestown DART 
Doylestown DART is a bus service in Doylestown that runs Monday through Saturday, connecting the Cross Keys Shopping Center with Neshaminy Manor. The bus service has stops serving residential and commercial areas, government offices, schools, shopping centers, and Doylestown Hospital. The Doylestown DART provides connections to SEPTA Regional Rail's Lansdale/Doylestown Line and SEPTA's Route 55 bus.

DART West 

DART West bus service connects Delaware Valley University and Doylestown DART with the central Bucks County boroughs of New Britain and Chalfont. The line serves as a connection between the DART system and SEPTA Regional Rail's Lansdale/Doylestown Line. It started operating on January 6, 2020 with service only running from Monday-Friday.

Buses 
Bucks County Transport uses a fleet of natural gas burning buses.

References

External links 
Bucks County Transport (official website)

Bucks County, Pennsylvania
Transit agencies in Pennsylvania
Transit agencies in the United States
Bus companies of the United States
Non-profit organizations based in Pennsylvania